Dario Božičić (Cyrillic: Дарио Божичић; born 30 August 1989) is a Serbian football midfielder.

References

External links
 
 Dario Božičić stats at Utakmica.rs
 

1989 births
Living people
Footballers from Novi Sad
Association football midfielders
Serbian footballers
FK Bežanija players
FK Rad players
RFK Novi Sad 1921 players
FK BSK Borča players
FK Donji Srem players
Serbian SuperLiga players